Daniela Scalia (born 9 November 1975 in Verona) is an anchorwoman and sports journalist. She also acts, appearing in the 2016 film The Legacy Run, a fictional sports procedural featuring the Italian cinema legend Nino Castelnuovo which she co-wrote with Luca Tramontin. She is producer, director and actress for the TV series Sport Crime.

Early life
She was born and raised in Verona in 1975. She has three sisters (Sara, Valeria and Claudia). In 2000, Scalia graduated in Foreign Languages and Literature in Verona and she speaks English fluently and is equally at ease with Italian and French.

Television
Scalia started her media career following volleyball and soccer for La Gazzetta dello Sport, L'Arena di Verona, Supervolley and TMC2.

In 2004 she moved to Sportitalia, anchoring the first live news on the national TV and following with the sister company features Eurosport and several “Calcio Serie A e B” programmes.

The big turning point came in 2007 when she anchored the International Rugby Board (IRB)'s official magazine program, Total Rugby, with Luca Tramontin. The show had been broadcast in over a hundred countries without any anchors, but Scalia and Tramontin were given the opportunity to change the format to "docu-talk".

Correspondent at the 2007 World Cup, and often traveling for the edgy and colourful Si Rugby she presented and wrote with Luca Tramontin, Gianluca Veneziano and rugby record-man Stefano Bettarello, magazine which often involved also Australian Football, Rugby League and other less known codes, she soon became a familiar face to the oval Italian community.

2008 to 2010 Scalia tied her public image to the daily live night show Prima Ora moving then to the massive afternoon news programmes of Sportitalia.

In 2011 she wrote and hosted with Luca Tramontin a show called the Oval Bin. Oval Bin was co-anchored by Gianluca Veneziano.

During Summer 2011, ahead of the Rugby World Cup in New Zealand, she anchored a surreal but historically accurate news program called Story Kiwi TG. She time-machined "reporters" Luca Tramontin and Gianluca Veneziano through the centuries of colonization and development of rugby in New Zealand "witnessing" facts like the first rugby match in Nelson or Captain Cook landing. In an interview to Sportincondotta Scalia said she regrets that such a successful and appreciated program had been closed as many others of hers, and even the fact it has been removed from the web.

In January 2013 she started anchoring the Ice Hockey magazine ESP Hockey on Espansione TV with her long term tv partner Luca Tramontin.

In 2017 FUNalysis: as the name says, Scalia and Tramontin created, produced and anchored on Sportitalia a TV show about the unbelievable aspects of the most remote sports, enforcing the fun-factor. Addressed also to a no-sport audience, the high rate programme covered the humoristic and social aspect of "The Ashes" (cricket clash between Australia and England), the relevance of Gaelic Football in identity, music and folklore, the misconceptions about the weight lifting training and more.

Sport Crime
During 2013, Tramontin and Scalia registered a concept for a TV series called Sport Crime. The intent was for the series to be based on sports investigations, telling the story of an agency based in Lugano that could intervene when an alleged crime or infraction endangers a team, a sport venue or an athlete.  Each episode is based on a different sport.

Scalia and Tramontin were involved in writing, plotting and directing episodes, and both appeared on screen as lead characters. Scalia also acts as main character.

The pair were successful in launching the concept with a 2016 TV movie, The Legacy Run, introducing intended Sport Crime themes, atmosphere and characters. The film, shot in Switzerland and Croatia, had its debut on 4 December 2016, on Swiss national television.

After the launch at the Mostra del Cinema di Venezia, the 1st season of the series is distributed on the Chili platform.

Books
Scalia cured and co-wrote In onda con 3 dita, a book revealing shocking and humorous details of Luca's life.

Magazines
Since January 2020 she is columnist and deputy editor of Sportdipiù.
Since April 2020 she holds a column about sports in Movie and TV Series at Globetodays.

On the entrepreneur oriented magazine Gli Stati Generali Scalia released an interview that caused heavy debate in the web, stating that Italian entrepreneurs are mainly "spoilt children of rich families, they circle around me with so-called great ideas, but they never come to something useful, just excuses to spend some time with me or to reach Luca (tramontin link). They got no decisional power, they just spend parents' money".

Athlete
Volleyball
She started playing volleyball at age of 9 after 3 years of gymnastics. She always played in Verona district minor series until 2004.

Australian football
In 2009 she started training and playing Australian football and earned an international cap playing with Italy against Ireland in a friendly during the men's 2010 EU Cup.
One year later she created and joined Orules but had to stop due to a damaged knee ligament legacy from volley days. She had an important surgery at 36 years of age in order to improve her training possibility and further her sports career.

GAA
She represented Italy in the Gaelic Football national team debut against France in Toulouse, November 2014  As of 2016, she was also in the Venetian Lionesses Ladies Team roster.

Cricket

She started playing cricket with Milan Kingsgrove in 2012. In 2015 she moved to the Olimpia Casteller Cricket Club and she won the Coppa Italia and finished the season as a runner up. In August 2015 she represented Italy in the Ireland and Jersey tour where the team conquer the european tournament. In 2018 she performed in the All Stars Tournament at the Royal Brussels Cricket Club with MCC Ladies Ambassadors.

Rugby
In 2015 she joined ASD Rugby Casale making her debut in the italian Serie A on April 12 in Tourin.

She also plays some ice hockey.

Football

June 2019, national Swiss TV and several media reported that Scalia and Tramontin had been working since September 2018 teaching the football youth club of FC Lugano on techniques and drills partly custom created and partly from rugby.

The unprecedented protocol is said immensely useful by neo president and owner Leonid Novoselskyi and coaches of the professional team.

Orules and other disabled sports
Scalia helped her colleague Tramontin in coaching and training disabled people in a new full contact oval ball formula. It has been well documented on TV and media in order to expand the code.

For serious mental and perceptive diseases the game consists in a code half way between rugby and Australian Football, while for medium degree of disability, the teams created by Tramontin adopt the Orules/Australian Football rules except for number of players and length of the periods.

Scalia is close to any form of team sport for disabled people, both organizing or trying to practice herself.

External links

References

Living people
Italian television journalists
Italian television presenters
Italian women journalists
Italian women television presenters
1975 births
People from Bellinzona